Me You Them is a 2000 Brazilian drama film directed by Andrucha Waddington.

Cast
 Regina Casé - Darlene
 Lima Duarte - Osias
 Stênio Garcia - Zezinho
 Luiz Carlos Vasconcelos - Ciro
 Nilda Spencer - Raquel
 Diogo Lopes - Vaqueiro negro / Black herdsman
 Helena Araújo - Darlene's mother
 Iami Rebouças - Moça do forró / Young woman at ball
 Lucien Paulo - Capataz / Headman
 Borges Cunha - Registry employee
 Plácido Alves Neto - Dono da venda / Store owner
 D. Dinorah - Osias' mother
 José Pascoal - Rapaz do forró / Young man at ball
 Zé Brocoió - Locutor / Speaker 1
 Clesio Atanasio - Locutor / Speaker 2

Awards
 53rd Cannes Film Festival - Un Certain Regard Special Distinction
 2nd Grande Prêmio Cinema Brasil - Best Film, Best Actress (Regina Casé), Best Cinematography, Best Editing
 35th Karlovy Vary International Film Festival - Crystal Globe, Best Actress (Regina Casé)

See also
 As Canções de Eu Tu Eles, the soundtrack album for the film performed by Gilberto Gil.

References

External links
 
 

2000 romantic comedy-drama films
2000 films
Brazilian romantic comedy-drama films
Crystal Globe winners
Films directed by Andrucha Waddington
2000s Portuguese-language films
Polyamory in fiction
Sony Pictures Classics films